FC Biolog-Novokubansk is a Russian football team from Progress settlement of Novokubansky District, founded in 1995. Since 2011 it plays in the third-level FNL 2. Previously it played in Russian amateur championship and Krasnodar Krai championship.

Current squad
As of 22 February 2023, according to the Second League website.

External links
  Team profile at www.2liga.ru
  Team profile at Footballfacts

Association football clubs established in 1995
Football clubs in Russia
Sport in Krasnodar Krai
1995 establishments in Russia